Gilbert Youlou Mabiala (born 3 March 1947), popularly known as Prince Youlou, is a Congo music recording artist, composer and vocalist, in the Republic of the Congo (Congo-Brazzaville). He was once a member of the Congo Music band TPOK Jazz which dominated the Congolese music scene from the 1960s through the 1980s.

Music career with OKJazz
Youlou Mabiala was born in Linzolo, a suburb of Brazzaville, the capital of the Republic of the Congo. He began his music career in Brazzaville with local groups. In 1963, he joined the musical band TPOK Jazz, in Kinshasa (Leopoldville), as a vocalist and composer. After initial stage jitters, he settled in under the tutelage of Vicky Longomba.

Youlou Mabiala is credited with composing the following songs for the band, among others:
 Celine
 Kamikaze
 Asumani
 Ledi
 Massi
 Lekwey (credited to both Franco & Youlou)

In 1972, Youlou was one of the musicians who defected from OKJazz to form the band known as Lovy du Zaïre, led by Vicky Longomba. Youlou then went on to form Somo-somo, with Jean Kwamy Munsi, Diatho Lukoki, Master Mwana Congo and Nona Simon.

He returned to OKJazz in 1975 and released the hit Kamikaze which was popular in Africa and among the African diaspora in Europe and North America. In 1977, Youlou left OKJazz for good.

Music career post OKJazz
After he left TPOK Jazz in May 1977, Youlou formed Trois Frères with Loko Massengo, Mose Fan Fan, Michel Boyibanda and others. They performed mainly in Brazzaville. In the 1980s, he sang with the band Kamikaze Loningisa, releasing the song Djeliba, among others.

On 15 August 2004, while taking part in the National Independence celebrations at the Présidence de la République hotel in Pointe-Noire, Republic of the Congo, Youlou Mabiala suffered a cerebral vascular accident (stroke). After initial stabilization in a hospital in Brazzaville, he was airlifted to a facility in Paris, France. Following discharge from hospital, he remained in France for rehabilitation.

Personal details
Prince Youlou Mabiala is married to one of the daughters of the late François Luambo Makiadi.

See also
 Franco Luambo Makiadi
 Sam Mangwana
 Josky Kiambukuta
 TPOK Jazz
 List of African musicians

References

External links
Overview of Legacy of Franco and TPOK Jazz
Interview with Simaro Lutumba in 2002

Living people
Republic of the Congo musicians
1947 births
Soukous musicians
TPOK Jazz members